Lascars is a French animated series created by Boris Dolivet, aka El Diablo, it was aired on the French channel Canal + for the first time in 1998. This series spawned two seasons, the first one in 1998 and the second in 2007, a pilot for a project of a 20-minute series, a comic and a movie. The episodes follow the mishaps of young men living in an inner-city district. The series is rife with hip-hop culture, and most of the voice cast are French rappers.

See also
Lascars (film)

1990s French animated television series
2000s French animated television series
1998 French television series debuts
2007 French television series endings
French children's animated comedy television series
Canal+ original programming
Television shows adapted into films